Zhu Zhiqie (朱志𡐤, 1404–1455) was a Chinese prince of the Ming dynasty. He was the son of Zhu Shangbing, Prince Yin of Qin and Lady Tang. He was the younger brother of Zhu Zhijun and Zhu Zhigeng. In 1422, he was made Prince of Fuping, and in 1428, he was made Prince of Qin.

Zhu Zhiqie died in 1455 and was given the posthumous name of Kang (康). Three years later, his title was inherited by his son, Zhu Gongxi, Prince Hui of Qin.

Family 
Consorts and Issue:
 Primary consort, of the Chen clan (陳氏, d. 1472), Deputy Commander of the West City Wardens Chen Zheng's (西城兵馬副指揮 陳政) daughter. In 1426, she was made Princess of Fuping (富平王妃), and in 1428, she was made Princess Kang of Qin (秦康王妃).
 Zhu Chengxi, Prince Hui of Qin (秦惠王 朱公錫; 1437–1486), fourth son
 Lady, of the Yang clan (夫人 杨氏)
 Lady, of the Zhou clan (夫人 周氏)
 Zhu Gongming, Prince An of Qin (秦安王 朱公銘; 14 October 1431 – 26 September 1474), first son
 Lady, of the Pan clan (夫人 潘氏)
 Zhu Gongtang, Prince Huigong of Heyang (郃陽惠恭王 朱公鏜; 9 September 1432 – 23 December 1471), second son
 Zhu Gongcheng, Prince Duanyi of Qianyang (汧陽端懿王 朱公鏳; 10 February 1436 – 29 June 1495), third son
 Unknown
 Zhu Gongjiang (朱公鍵), died young, fifth son
 Princess Yanchuan (延川郡主), first daughter
 Married Liu Zhen (劉振)
 Princess Chengcheng (澄城郡主), second daughter
 Married Li Xun (李恂)
 Princess Shiquan (石泉郡主), third daughter
 Married Li Yu (李裕)
 Princess Baoji (寶雞郡主), fourth daughter
 Married Fan Ying (樊瑛)

References 

1404 births
1455 deaths
Ming dynasty imperial princes